Knut Fredrik Idestam (28 October 1838, Tyrväntö, Grand Duchy of Finland – 8 April 1916, Helsinki, Grand Duchy of Finland) was a Finnish mining engineer and businessman, best known as a founder of Nokia.

In May 1865, Idestam obtained a permit to construct a groundwood paper mill at Tampere, Finland. The mill began operations in 1866. In 1871, Idestam and Leo Mechelin founded Nokia Ltd. and moved the company's operations to the city of Nokia, Finland.

He was buried in the Hietaniemi Cemetery in Helsinki.

Notes

External links
Tapio Helen, Fredrik Idestam (1838–1916), National Biography of Finland, Finnish Historical Society

1838 births
1916 deaths
People from Häme Province (Grand Duchy of Finland)
Swedish-speaking Finns
Mining engineers
Nokia people
Burials at Hietaniemi Cemetery
19th-century Finnish businesspeople